Holland is a region within the Netherlands that is now split into the provinces of North Holland and South Holland.

Holland may also refer to:

Places

Netherlands
Holland may refer to the Netherlands as a whole, in informal contexts and sports events
County of Holland, a historical county in the Holy Roman Empire de facto until 1581, formally until 1795
Dutch Republic or Republic of the Seven United Provinces, an independent aristocratic Republic from 1579/1581 until 1795, frequently called "Holland" in literature
Kingdom of Holland, a French vassal state covering roughly the area of the Netherlands during the Napoleonic era (1806–1810)

Canada
Holland, Manitoba, a city
Holland Landing, an unincorporated community in Ontario
Holland River, Ontario

Singapore
Holland Village, Singapore, a neighbourhood

United Kingdom

Subdivisions 
Parts of Holland, a traditional subdivision of Lincolnshire and former administrative county

Populated places
Holland-on-Sea, Essex, a town
Holland, former name of Up Holland, Lancashire
Holland, Orkney, a settlement on the island of Papa Westray
Holland, Surrey, a neighbourhood of Oxted
Great Holland, a village in Essex
Holland Park, a part of Kensington, London
New Holland, Lincolnshire, a village

United States

Holland, Arkansas
Holland, Georgia
Holland, Indiana
Holland, Iowa
Holland, Kansas
Holland, Kentucky
Holland, Massachusetts, a New England town
Holland (CDP), Massachusetts, the main village in the town
Holland, Michigan 
Holland, Minnesota, city in Pipestone County
Holland, Minneapolis, Minnesota
Holland, Missouri
Holland Township, New Jersey, in Hunterdon County
Holland, Monmouth County, New Jersey
Holland, New York
Holland, North Carolina
Holland, Ohio
Holland, Pennsylvania 
Holland, Texas 
Holland, Vermont
Holland, Wisconsin (disambiguation)
Holland Township, Michigan (disambiguation) 
Holland Township, Minnesota
South Holland, Illinois

People

Holland (surname)
R. Holland Duell (1824–1891), US congressman from New York
Charles Holland Duell (1850–1920), American politician and judge
Holland S. Duell (1881–1942), New York politician
Holland Roden  (born 1986), American actress
Holland Taylor (born 1943), American film, stage, and television actress, and playwright
Holland (singer) (born 1996), South Korean singer
Agnieszka Holland, Polish film and television director and screenwriter

Art, entertainment, and media

Music

Groups and artists
Holland (singer) (born 1996), South Korean singer
Holland, the former name of a rock ‘n’ roll band from Nashville, Tennessee, now known as The Lonely Hearts
Gollandia (or Gollandiya), Russian rock/blues band
Holland–Dozier–Holland, a songwriting and production team

Albums
Holland, by The Beach Boys

Songs
"Holland", a song by Sufjan Stevens on his album Michigan
"Holland, 1945", a song on the In the Aeroplane Over the Sea album by Neutral Milk Hotel

Other arts, entertainment, and media
Holland Doc, a documentary channel of the Netherlands
Holland Festival, a performing arts festival in the Netherlands
Holland Novak, a fictional character from the Eureka Seven anime and manga series

Brands and enterprises
Holland (publisher), Dutch publishing house
Holland, a brand of YRC Worldwide
Holland & Holland, British gun-maker
Holland & Holland coachbuilders, former London firm of coachbuilders.
Holland, Hannen & Cubitts, a British building firm
Holland Land Company, an unincorporated syndicate of Dutch investors
Holland Publishing, UK publishing house

English titles
Baron Holland, an English noble title, now extinct
Earl of Holland, an English noble title, now extinct
Holland baronets, four baronetcies created for persons with the surname Holland

Sports
Holland Dream, basketball team in Holland, Michigan
Holland F.C., football club in England
Holland Ladies Tour, women's elite professional road bicycle racing stage race
Netherlands national football team, also known as Holland

Structures
Holland Harbor Light, harbor light in Ottawa County, Michigan
Holland House, built in 1605, one of the first great houses in Kensington, London
Holland Island Bar Light, U.S. lighthouse

Submarines and ships
A range of prototype and commissioned submarines were designed and built by, or named for, John Philip Holland. The prototypes were designated using the Roman numerals (I–VI). The Holland VI prototype became the USS Holland (SS-1), the first US Navy submarine. The British Royal Navy submarines based on designs by Holland were designated using the Arabic numerals (1–6).

Prototype submarines
Holland I (1878)
Holland II
Holland III (1883)
Holland VI (1897–1900) – after trial runs and modifications, this prototype was commissioned in 1900 by the US Navy as USS Holland (SS-1), the US Navy's first submarine

Commissioned submarines and ships
USS Holland (SS-1) (1900–1913) – in origin, this craft was launched in 1897 as the Holland VI prototype, and was given the USS Holland designation after it was commissioned in 1900 by the US Navy as its first submarine
Holland-class submarine, Royal Navy
 (1901–1913)
 (1902–1913)
 (1902–1913)
 (1902–1914)
 (1902–1912)
American Holland-class submarine, a Russian class of submarines
HNLMS Holland, several Dutch navy ships
USS Holland, list of ships called USS Holland

Transportation
Holland America Line, shipping and passenger line 
Holland Arms railway station, UK railway station
Holland station (Michigan), a railroad station in Holland, Michigan, USA
Holland station (SEPTA), a former railroad station in Holland, Pennsylvania, USA
Holland Tunnel, a highway tunnel under the Hudson River,  carrying vehicular traffic over Interstate 78, between Manhattan, New York City and Jersey City, New Jersey

Other uses
Holland chicken, a breed of chicken originating in the United States
Holland Christian Schools, a private Christian school system in Holland, Michigan
Holland cloth, a plainwoven linen fabric

See also

Dutchland (disambiguation)
Netherlands (disambiguation)

New Holland (disambiguation)
Holand (disambiguation)
Hollands (disambiguation)
Hollander (disambiguation) (includes Hollaender and Holländer)
François Hollande
Hollandaise sauce
Hollandia (disambiguation)
Hollond (surname)